Geddes Crag is a crag immediately south of the All-Blacks Nunataks,  northwest of Rutland Nunatak, in Antarctica. It was named in honor of Dave Geddes, who was involved in operational work for the Department of Scientific and Industrial Research Antarctic Division and the New Zealand Antarctic Programme from 1986 to 1995.

References

Cliffs of Oates Land